The Cabinet of Jón Magnússon was formed 22 March 1924.

Cabinets

Inaugural cabinet

Change (8 July 1926)

See also 

1924 establishments in Iceland
1926 disestablishments in Iceland
Jon Magnusson, Third cabinet of
Cabinets established in 1924
Cabinets disestablished in 1926